Reliance is a town in Lyman County, South Dakota, United States. The population was 128 at the 2020 census.

Reliance was laid out in 1905.

Geography

Reliance is located at  (43.878490, -99.601138).

Reliance has been assigned the ZIP code 57569 and the FIPS place code 54020.

Medicine Butte is near Reliance. It rises about 200 feet above the prairie, and is sacred to the Brulé Sioux people, especially those who live on the nearby Lower Brule Indian Reservation.

Demographics

2010 census
As of the census of 2010, there were 191 people, 73 households, and 52 families residing in the town. The racial makeup of the town was 77.0% White, 0.5% African American, 17.8% Native American, 0.5% from other races, and 4.2% from two or more races. Hispanic or Latino of any race were 1.6% of the population.

There were 73 households, of which 34.2% had children under the age of 18 living with them, 58.9% were married couples living together, 6.8% had a female householder with no husband present, 5.5% had a male householder with no wife present, and 28.8% were non-families. 26.0% of all households were made up of individuals, and 12.3% had someone living alone who was 65 years of age or older. The average household size was 2.62 and the average family size was 2.96.

The median age in the town was 40.1 years. 30.9% of residents were under the age of 18; 3.1% were between the ages of 18 and 24; 22.5% were from 25 to 44; 26.2% were from 45 to 64; and 17.3% were 65 years of age or older. The gender makeup of the town was 48.2% male and 51.8% female.

2000 census
As of the census of 2000, there were 206 people, 84 households, and 54 families residing in the town. The population density was 189.4 people per square mile (73.0/km2). There were 92 housing units at an average density of 84.6 per square mile (32.6/km2). The racial makeup of the town was 90.29% White, 5.34% Native American, and 4.37% from two or more races.

There were 84 households, out of which 35.7% had children under the age of 18 living with them, 47.6% were married couples living together, 10.7% had a female householder with no husband present, and 35.7% were non-families. 32.1% of all households were made up of individuals, and 11.9% had someone living alone who was 65 years of age or older. The average household size was 2.45 and the average family size was 3.11.

In the town, the population was spread out, with 28.6% under the age of 18, 9.2% from 18 to 24, 25.2% from 25 to 44, 25.2% from 45 to 64, and 11.7% who were 65 years of age or older. The median age was 37 years. For every 100 females, there were 100.0 males. For every 100 females age 18 and over, there were 101.4 males.

The median income for a household in the town was $30,833, and the median income for a family was $35,417. Males had a median income of $22,361 versus $21,875 for females. The per capita income for the town was $14,141. About 4.1% of families and 11.2% of the population were below the poverty line, including 9.2% of those under the age of eighteen and 24.0% of those 65 or over.

References

External links
 Reliance Chamber of Commerce

Towns in Lyman County, South Dakota
Towns in South Dakota